World Dairy Expo is a five-day event showcasing dairy cattle and the newest technologies available to the dairy industry. The show is held annually at the Alliant Energy Center in Madison, Wisconsin, United States. Considered the largest and most important dairy cattle show in North America, it has been held in the first week of October since 1967, except 2020 when it was cancelled due to the COVID-19 pandemic.

Themes
One of the unusual aspects about the World Dairy Expo is its themes. Since the late 1980s the show has had a theme, when the showing is decorated with two backdrops that correspond to that year's theme. Themes have ranged from the simple to the extravagant, like the "Excitement is Building" theme which had a huge construction-like backdrop.

Cattle show
Dairy cattle from all over North America, Europe & Australia are exhibited at the show. All seven nationally recognized breeds (Brown Swiss, Holstein, Red & White, Guernsey, Jersey, Milking Shorthorn, and Ayrshire) have a show. After a grand champion from each breed is selected, a final judging is held to determine the best two cows in the show. This is held on the last day (Saturday) and is often referred to as the main event. The show starts out with an introduction of each cow and leadsman (person at the end of the halter) listing both of their achievements. After this is done the cows are judged by all of the breed judges from the past week. After they decide on a cow, the Supreme Champion and Reserve Supreme Champion is announced.

Trade show
World Dairy Expo is also home to the a largest dairy-focused trade show in the world. Nearly 900 companies from all over the world exhibit to the show's 70,000 attendees.  Companies like John Deere, Case IH, Land O'Lakes, Select Sires, Semex, ABS, ANIMART and many more make the trip to Madison, Wisconsin, USA every year. World Dairy Expo is recognized as a member of the "Tradeshow Week Top 200", a list honoring the nation's top trade events organized by Trade Show Executive Gold 100. World Dairy Expo remains the only Wisconsin event in the “Top 200”, and was ranked #23 in 2013.

Youth contests
World Dairy Expo offers conferences for the youth in the dairy industry. There are several regional and national judging contests in which teams and individuals from high school FFA chapters and 4-H programs can compete in as well as a division for Collegiate level teams. Contestants compete for honors in dairy judging, dairy foods and dairy forage. There is a separate junior cattle show for contestants who are college age or younger. This cattle show is separate from the main show and Supreme and Reserve Supreme champions are named the same way as the older contestants. Winning the junior show is almost as prestigious as winning the open show.

References

External links
Official website

Agricultural shows in the United States
American dairy organizations
Cattle in the United States
Trade shows in the United States
Wisconsin culture